Vyborg is a town in, and the administrative center of, Vyborgsky District in Leningrad Oblast, Russia. The population of Vyborg is as follows:  As of the 2021 Russian census, the population of Vyborg is 72,530.

Located in the boundary zone between the East Slavic/Russian and Finnish worlds, formerly well known as one of the few medieval towns in Finland, Vyborg has changed hands several times in history, most recently in 1944 when the Soviet Union captured it from Finland during World War II. Finland evacuated the entire population of the city and resettled them within the rest of the country. On March 25, 2010, Dmitry Medvedev named Vyborg the "City of Military Glory". In Russia, a city can be awarded that title if there have been fierce battles in or near the city and in the Russian view, the defenders of the homeland have shown bravery, perseverance, and general heroism. During the Finnish Civil War in 1918, Vyborg was officially the second-most significant city in Finland after Helsinki, representing it as Finland's most multicultural city internationally.

The city hosts the Russian end of the  Nord Stream 1 gas pipeline, laid in 2011 and operated by a consortium led by Russia's Gazprom state hydrocarbons enterprise to pump  of natural gas a year under the Baltic Sea to Lubmin, Germany.

History

Early history
According to archeological research, the area of what is now Vyborg used to be a trading center on the Vuoksi River's western branch, which has since dried up. The region was inhabited by the Karelians, a Balto-Finnic tribe which gradually came under the domination of Novgorod and Sweden. It has been claimed that Vyborg appeared in the 11th–12th centuries as a mixed Karelian-Russian settlement, although there is no archeological proof of any East Slavic settlement of that time in the area and it is not mentioned in any earliest historical documents, such as the Novgorod First Chronicle or the Primary Chronicle. Wider settlement in the area of Vyborg is generally regarded to date from 13th century onwards when Hanseatic traders began traveling to Novgorod.

Vyborg Castle was founded during the Third Swedish Crusade in 1293 by marsk Torkel Knutsson on the site of an older Karelian fort which was burned. The castle, which was the first centre for the spread of Christianity in Karelia, was fought over for decades between Sweden and the Republic of Novgorod. As a result of the Treaty of Nöteborg in 1323 between the Novgorod Republic and Sweden, Vyborg was finally recognized as a part of Sweden. The town's trade privileges were chartered by the Pan-Scandinavian King Eric of Pomerania in 1403. It withstood a prolonged siege by Daniil Shchenya during the Russo-Swedish War of 1496–1497.

Under Swedish rule, Vyborg was closely associated with the noble family of Bååt, originally from Småland. The late-medieval commanders and fief holders of Vyborg were (almost always) descended from or married to the Bååt family. In practice, though not having this as their formal title, they functioned as Margraves, had feudal privileges, and kept all the crown's incomes from the fief to use for the defense of the realm's eastern border.

1710 to 1917
Vyborg remained in Swedish hands until its capture in 1710 after the Siege of Vyborg by Tsar Peter the Great in the Great Northern War. In the course of Peter's second administrative reform, Vyborg became the seat of the Vyborg Province of St. Petersburg Governorate. The 1721 Treaty of Nystad, which concluded the war with Sweden, finalized the transfer of the town and a part of Old Finland to Russia. The loss of Vyborg led Sweden to develop Fredrikshamn as a substitute port town. Another result of the loss of Vyborg was that its diocese was moved to Borgå, transforming the town into an important learning centre.

In 1744, Vyborg became the seat of the Vyborg Governorate. In 1783, the governorate was transformed into the Vyborg Viceroyalty and in 1801 back into Vyborg Governorate. In 1802, the Vyborg Governorate was renamed the Finland Governorate.

One of the largest naval battles in history, the Battle of Vyborg Bay, was fought off the shore of the Vyborg Bay on July 4, 1790.

After the rest of Finland was ceded to Russia in 1809, Emperor Alexander I incorporated the town and the governorate into the newly-created Grand Duchy of Finland in 1811 (1812 NS).

Over the course of the 19th century, the town developed as the centre of administration and trade for eastern Finland. The inauguration of the Saimaa Canal in 1856 benefited the local economy, as it opened the vast waterways of Eastern Finland to the sea. Vyborg was never a major industrial center and lacked large production facilities, but its location made it serve as a focal point of transports of all industries on the Karelian Isthmus, Ladoga Karelia and southeastern Finland. Trams in Vyborg started in 1912.

The Bolshevik revolutionary Vladimir Lenin lived in the town for a period between the February Revolution and October Revolution of 1917.

Finnish period
Following the Russian Revolution of 1917 and the fall of the Russian Empire, Finland declared itself independent. During the Finnish Civil War, Vyborg was in the hands of the Finnish Red Guards until it was captured by the White Guard in the Battle of Vyborg, on April 29, 1918.  In April to May 1918, 360 to civilians were murdered by White Guards during the Vyborg massacre. The city served as the starting point of the civil war, which later spread to the rest of Finland. 

Vyborg served as the seat of Viipuri Province. In the 1930 census, the administrative area of the city of Vyborg had 52,253 inhabitants. There were a total of 19,986 inhabitants in the rural areas of Vyborg and in Uura, which was located outside the borders of Vyborg but was included in the census, and so the total population of the census area was 72,239. Of the total inhabitants in the census area, 67,609 spoke Finnish, 2,103 Swedish, 1,807 Russian and 439 German. In 1939, the population was slightly less than 75,000 and was Finland's second-largest (Population Register) or fourth-largest (Church and Civil Register) city, depending on the census data. Vyborg had sizable minorities of Swedes, Germans, Russians, Romani, Tatars and Jews. During that time, Alvar Aalto built the Vyborg Library, an icon of functionalist architecture.

Winter and Continuation Wars

During the Winter War between the Soviet Union and Finland in 1939–1940, over 70,000 people were evacuated from Vyborg to other parts of Finland. The Winter War was concluded by the Moscow Peace Treaty, which stipulated the transfer of Vyborg to Soviet control, and the whole Karelian Isthmus, and those places were emptied of their residents, to Soviet control. It was incorporated into the Karelo-Finnish Soviet Socialist Republic on March 31, 1940. As the town was still held by the Finns, the remaining Finnish population, some 10,000 people, had to be evacuated in haste before the handover. Thus, practically the whole population of Finnish Vyborg was resettled elsewhere in Finland. The town became the administrative center of Vyborgsky District.

The evacuees from Finnish Karelia came to be a vociferous political force, and their wish to return to their homes was an important motive when Finland sought support from Nazi Germany against the Soviet Union. As a result, Finland fought with Nazi Germany as a co-belligerent during the Second World War.

On August 29, 1941, Vyborg was captured by Finnish troops. At first, the Finnish Army did not allow civilians into the town. Of the 6,287 buildings, 3,807 had been destroyed. The first civilians started to arrive on late September, and by the end of the year, Vyborg had a population of about 9,700. In December 1941, the Finnish government formally annexed the town, along with the other areas that had been lost in the Moscow Peace Treaty. However, the annexation was not recognized by any foreign state, even Finland's ally, Germany. By 1942, the population had risen to 16,000. About 70% of the evacuees from Finnish Karelia returned after the reconquest to rebuild their looted homes but were again evacuated after the Red Army's Vyborg–Petrozavodsk Offensive, timed to coincide with the Battle of Normandy. By the time of the Soviet offensive, the town had a population of nearly 28,000. The town was captured by the Red Army on June 20, 1944, but the Finnish forces, using war material provided by Germany, managed to halt the Soviet offensive at the Battle of Tali-Ihantala, the largest battle fought by any of the Nordic countries, in Viipuri Rural Municipality, which surrounded the town, during which the town was seriously damaged.

In the subsequent Moscow Armistice on September 19, 1944, Finland returned to the borders set by the Moscow Peace Treaty and ceded more land than the treaty originally demanded. In the Paris Peace Treaties (1947), Finland relinquished all claims to Vyborg.

Soviet era
After the Second World War, Leningrad Oblast wanted to incorporate the area of Vyborg, but it took until November 1944 for the area to be finally transferred from the Karelo-Finnish SSR. During the Soviet era, the town was settled by people from all over the Soviet Union. The naval air bases of Pribilovo and Veshchevo were built nearby.

In 1940s and the 1950s, new factories were built: shipbuilding (1948), instrumentational (1953). In 1960, a local history museum was opened.

Administrative and municipal status

Within the framework of administrative divisions, Vyborg serves as the administrative center of Vyborgsky District. As an administrative division, it is incorporated within Vyborgsky District as Vyborgskoye Settlement Municipal Formation. As a municipal division, Vyborgskoye Settlement Municipal Formation is incorporated within Vyborg Municipal District as Vyborgskoye Urban Settlement.

Climate
Similar to many other areas along the Baltic Sea, Vyborg has a humid continental climate (Dfb) with large temperature differences between summer and winter. The climate is characterised by a fairly cloudy beginning of winter, but an increasing share of sunshine from February. Winter temperatures are being somewhat moderated by maritime effects compared to Russian cities further inland even on more southerly latitudes, but still cold enough to be comparable to areas much further north that are nearer the Gulf Stream. The beginning of spring is generally sunny and rather low in precipitation. Summer is moderately warm. Autumn is generally cloudy and rainy. The most dominant are the south-west and south winds.

Economy and culture

Vyborg continues to be an important industrial producer of paper. Tourism is increasingly important, and the Russian film festival Window to Europe takes place in the town each year.
 Vyborg Shipyard
An HVDC back-to-back facility for the exchange of electricity between the Russian and Finnish power grids was completed near Vyborg in 1982. It consists of three bipolar HVDC back-to-back schemes with an operating voltage of 85 kV and a maximum transmission rate of 355 MW, so that the entire maximum transmission rate amounts to 1,420 MW.

The Nord Stream 1 offshore pipeline runs from Vyborg compressor station at Portovaya Bay along the bottom of the Baltic Sea to Lubmin in Germany. It started operating in September 2011, enabling Russia to export gas directly to Western Europe. The feeding pipeline in Russia (Gryazovets–Vyborg gas pipeline) is operated by Gazprom and is a part of the integrated gas transport network of Russia connecting existing grid in Gryazovets with the coastal compressor station at Vyborg.

Finnish singing culture
Before the war, Vyborg was a major Finnish town of culture. Even today, a few choirs cherish Vyborg singing traditions. These are, for example, the Wiipurilaisen osakunnan kuoro of the University of Helsinki and the Viipurin Lauluveikot male choir, with the latter founded in Vyborg in 1897.

Sights

Vyborg's most prominent landmark is its Swedish-built castle, started in the 13th century and extensively reconstructed in 1891–1894. The Round Tower and the Rathaus Tower date from the mid-16th century and are parts of the Medieval Vyborg town wall. Many of the buildings in historical old town of Vyborg are still in poor condition today.

The Viipuri Library by Finnish architect Alvar Aalto and the Hermitage-Vyborg Center are a reference point in the history of modern architecture. There are also Russian fortifications of Annenkrone, completed by 1740, as well as the monuments to Peter the Great (1910) and Torkel Knutsson. Tourists can also visit the house where the founder of the Soviet state Vladimir Lenin prepared the Bolshevik revolution during his stay in Vyborg from September 24 to October 7, 1917. The main street in Vyborg is called Prospekt Lenina (literally "Lenin Avenue"), formerly also known as Torkkelinkatu, and along it, there is popular .

Sprawling along the heights adjacent to the Gulf of Finland is Monrepos Park, one of the most spacious English landscape gardens in Eastern Europe. The garden was laid out on behest of its owner, Baron Ludwig Heinrich von Nicolay, at the turn of the 19th century. Most of its structures were designed by the architect Giuseppe Antonio Martinelli. Previously, the estate belonged to the future king Frederick I (Maria Fyodorovna's brother), who called it Charlottendahl in honor of his second wife.

Notable people

Born before 1917

 for people born in Viipuri Province between 1812 and 1917, when it was part of the Grand Duchy of Finland.

Born 1917–1945

 Lauri Törni (a.k.a. Larry Thorne; 1919–1965), Finnish Army captain who later served in the German and United States armies
 Sirkka Sari (1920 in Raivola1939), Finnish actress
 Lars Lindeman (1920–2006), Finnish politician and ambassador in Oslo, Reykjavik, and Lisbon
 Pekka Malinen (1921–2004), minister and diplomat, ambassador in Egypt, Syria, and Portugal
 Paul Jyrkänkallio (1922 in Koivisto2004), Finnish diplomat, ambassador in Sofia, Rome, and Athens
 Usko Santavuori (1922 in Viipuri2003), Finnish sensationalist radio reporter
 Max Jakobson (1923–2013), Finnish diplomat and journalist of Finnish-Jewish descent
 Tankmar Horn (1924–2018), Finnish diplomat, economist, and businessman.
 Heimo Haitto (1925–1999), Finnish-American classical violinist and child prodigy
 Juhani Kumpulainen (1925 in Viipuri1991), Finnish actor and director
 Seppo Pietinen (1925–1990), Finnish diplomat, Ambassador in Addis Ababa, Lima, Vienna, and Paris
 Irina Hudova (1926-2015), Finnish ballet dancer and teacher
 Ilmi Parkkari (1926–1979), Finnish film and stage actress
 Erik Bruun (born 1926 in Viipuri), Finnish graphic designer
 Ossi Runne (1927 - 2020), Finnish musician
 Heikki Seppä (1927 in Säkkijärvi2010), Finnish-American master metalsmith, educator and author  
 Veijo Meri (1928–2015), Finnish writer, his work focuses on war and its absurdity
 Casper Wrede (1929 in Viipuri1998), Finnish theatre and film director
 Esko Kunnamo (1929–2014), Finnish diplomat, ambassador in Kuwait, Abu Dhabi & Lagos
 Paavo Rintala (1930–1999), Finnish novelist and theologian
 Pertti Ripatti (1930–2016), Finnish diplomat, ambassador in Abu Dhabi, Caracas & Kuala Lumpur
 Oiva Toikka (1931–2019), Finnish glass designer
 Lasse Äikäs (1932 in Kuolemajärvi1988), Finnish lawyer, civil servant and politician
 Kari Nurmela (Viipuri 19331984), Finnish dramatic baritone 
 Pertti Kärkkäinen (1933–2017), Finnish diplomat, Ambassador to Buenos Aires, Santiago & Lima
 Pentti Ikonen (1934–2007), Finnish swimmer, competed in 3 events at the 1952 Summer Olympics
 Martti Ahtisaari (born 1937 in Viipuri), Finnish politician, the tenth President of Finland (1994–2000) and Nobel Peace Prize laureate
 Gustav Hägglund (born 1938 in Viipuri), retired Finnish general, Chief of Defence 1994–2001
 Laila Hirvisaari (1938–2021, born in Viipuri), Finnish author and writer
 Heikki Talvitie (born 1939), Finnish diplomat, Ambassador in Belgrade, Moscow & Stockholm
 Riitta Uosukainen (born 1942 in Jääski), Finnish politician and former MP, Counselor of State

Born after 1945 
 Negmatullo Kurbanov  (born 1963), Tajik major general in the Ministry of Internal Affairs (Tajikistan)
 Viatcheslav Ekimov (born 1966), nicknamed Eki, Russian former professional racing cyclist and triple Olympic gold medalist
 Aleksandr Vlasov (born 1996), Professional cyclist, currently rides for Team Astana-Premier Tech
 Vitaly Petrov (born 1984), Russian racing driver who competed in Formula One from 2010 to 2012
 Aleksei Kangaskolkka (born 1988), Russian-born Finnish footballer, who plays for Finnish side IFK Mariehamn
 Kirill Alekseenko (born 1997), Russian chess grandmaster, participant in the Candidates Tournament 2020

Twin towns and sister cities

Vyborg is twinned with:
 Bodø, Norway
 Lappeenranta, Finland
 Nyköping, Sweden
 Ramla, Israel
 Stirling, Scotland

See also
 European route E18
 Saimaa Canal
 Vyborg railway station

References

Notes

Sources

External links

Official website of Vyborg 
History and attractions of Vyborg

 
Grand Duchy of Finland
Forts in Russia
Castles in Russia
Karelian Isthmus
Medieval Finnish towns